Sidfa (from ) is a town in Egypt. It is located near the city of Abnub in the Asyut Governorate. It was known in antiquity by the Greeks as Hisopis.

See also

 List of cities and towns in Egypt

References

Populated places in Asyut Governorate
Former populated places in Egypt
Cities in Egypt